Languid Kisses, Wet Caresses is a 1976 Italian comedy film directed by Alfredo Angeli.

Cast 

 Gigi Proietti as Orfeo Scardamazzi 
 Giovanna Ralli as  Elena 
 Elisa Cegani as  Clorinda
 Cristiano Censi as  Fabio 
  Maria Los as  Elettra
 Nerina Montagnani as The Maid
 Giacomo Rizzo as The Policeman

See also 
 List of Italian films of 1976

References

External links
 

1976 films
Italian comedy films
1970s Italian-language films
1976 comedy films
Films scored by Guido & Maurizio De Angelis
Films set in Rome
1970s Italian films